Nigel Sefton Paneth (born 19 September 1946) is an English pediatrician and epidemiologist who serves as Professor of Epidemiology and Biostatistics and Pediatrics at Michigan State University. He is known for his research on the causes of childhood neurodevelopmental disorders such as cerebral palsy. He formerly served as a designer and principal investigator for the National Children's Study.

References

External links
Faculty profile

1946 births
Living people
British epidemiologists
Medical doctors from London
Michigan State University faculty
British paediatricians
English emigrants to the United States
Columbia College (New York) alumni
Geisel School of Medicine alumni
Harvard Medical School alumni
Columbia University Mailman School of Public Health alumni